In conformal field theory and representation theory, a W-algebra is an associative algebra that generalizes the Virasoro algebra. W-algebras were introduced by Alexander Zamolodchikov, and the name "W-algebra" comes from the fact that Zamolodchikov used the letter W for one of the elements of one of his examples.

Definition

A W-algebra is an associative algebra that is generated by the modes of a finite number of meromorphic fields , including the energy-momentum tensor . For ,  is a primary field of conformal dimension . The generators  of the algebra are related to the meromorphic fields by the mode expansions

This number is also called the central charge of the W-algebra. The commutation relations

are equivalent to the assumption that  is a primary field of dimension .
The rest of the commutation relations can in principle be determined by solving the Jacobi identities.

Given a finite set of conformal dimensions  (not necessarily all distinct), the number of W-algebras generated by  may be zero, one or more. The resulting W-algebras may exist for all , or only for some specific values of the central charge.

A W-algebra is called freely generated if its generators obey no other relations than the commutation relations. Most commonly studied W-algebras are freely generated, including the W(N) algebras. In this article, the sections on representation theory and correlation functions apply to freely generated W-algebras.

Constructions

While it is possible to construct W-algebras by assuming the existence of a number of meromorphic fields  and solving the Jacobi identities, there also exist systematic constructions of families of W-algebras.

Drinfeld-Sokolov reduction

From a finite-dimensional Lie algebra , together with an embedding , a W-algebra may be constructed from the universal enveloping algebra of the affine Lie algebra  by a kind of BRST construction.
Then the central charge of the W-algebra is a function of the level of the affine Lie algebra.

Coset construction

Given a finite-dimensional Lie algebra , together with a subalgebra , a W-algebra  may be constructed from the corresponding affine Lie algebras .

Commutator of a set of screenings

The W(N) algebras

For any integer , the W(N) algebra is a W-algebra which is generated by  meromorphic fields of dimensions . The W(2) algebra coincides with the Virasoro algebra.

Construction

The W(N) algebra is obtained by Drinfeld-Sokolov reduction of the affine Lie algebra . 

The trivial partition  corresponds to the W(N) algebra, while  corresponds to  itself. In the case , the partition 
 leads to the Bershadsky-Polyakov algebra, whose generating fields have the dimensions .

Properties

The central charge of the W(N) algebra is given in terms of the level  of the affine Lie algebra by 
 
in notations where the central charge of the affine Lie algebra is 

It is possible to choose a basis such that the commutation relations are invariant under .

Example of the W(3) algebra

The W(3) algebra is generated by the generators of the Virasoro algebra , plus another infinite family of generators . The commutation relations are

where  is the central charge, and we define 

The  field  is such that .

Representation theory

Highest weight representations

A highest weight representation of a W-algebra is a representation that is generated by a primary state: a vector  such that

for some numbers  called the charges, including the conformal dimension .

Given a set  of charges, the corresponding Verma module is the largest highest-weight representation that is generated by a primary state with these charges. A basis of the Verma module is 

Except for  itself, the elements of this basis are called descendant states, and their linear combinations are also called descendant states.  

For generic values of the charges, the Verma module is the only highest weight representation. For special values of the charges that depend on the algebra's central charge,  there exist other highest weight representations, called degenerate representations. Degenerate representations exist if 
the Verma module is reducible, and
they are quotients of the Verma module by its nontrivial submodules.

Degenerate representations

If a Verma module is reducible, any indecomposible submodule is itself a highest weight representation, and is generated by a state that is both descendant and primary, called a null state or null vector. A degenerate representation is obtained by setting one or more null vectors to zero. Setting all the null vectors to zero leads to an irreducible representation. 

The structures and characters of irreducible representations can be deduced by Drinfeld-Sokolov reduction from representations of affine Lie algebras.

The existence of null vectors is possible only under -dependent constraints on the charge . A Verma module can have only finitely many null vectors that are not descendants of other null vectors. If we start from a Verma module that has a maximal number of null vectors, and set all these null vectors to zero, we obtain an irreducible representation called a fully degenerate representation. 

For example, in the case of the algebra W(3), the  Verma module with vanishing charges  has the three null vectors  at levels 1, 1 and 2. Setting these null vectors to zero yields a fully degenerate representation called the vacuum module. 
The simplest nontrivial fully degenerate representation of W(3) has vanishing null vectors at levels 1, 2 and 3, whose expressions are explicitly known. 

An alternative characterization of a fully degenerate representation is that its fusion product with any Verma module is a sum of finitely many indecomposable representations.

Case of W(N)

The  positive simple roots are sums of any number of consecutive simple roots, and the Weyl vector is their half-sum , which obeys . Then the momentum is a vector 

The charges  are functions of the momentum and the central charge, invariant under the action of the Weyl group. The conformal dimension is 

Let us parametrize the central charge in terms of a number  such that 
 
If there is a positive root  and two integers  such that  

then the Verma module of momentum  has a null vector at level . This null vector is itself a primary state of momentum  or equivalently (by a Weyl reflection) .
The number of independent null vectors is the number of positive roots such that 
 
(up to a Weyl reflection). 

The maximal number of null vectors is the number of positive roots . The corresponding momentums are of the type  

Let us call  the corresponding fully degenerate representation of the W(N) algebra.

The fusion product of the fully degenerate representation  of W(N) with a Verma module  of momentum  is then

Correlation functions

Primary fields

To a primary state of charge , the state-field correspondence associates a primary field , whose operator product expansions with the fields  are 

On any field , the mode  of the energy-momentum tensor acts as a derivative, .

Ward identities

On the Riemann sphere, if there is no field at infinity, we have 
. For , the identity  may be inserted in any correlation function. Therefore, the field  gives rise to  global Ward identities. 

Local Ward identities are obtained by inserting , where  is a meromorphic function such that .

For example, in the case of a three-point function on the sphere  of W(3)-primary fields, local Ward identities determine all the descendant three-point functions as linear combinations of descendant three-point functions that involve only .

In the W(3) algebra, as in generic W-algebras, correlation functions of descendant fields can therefore not be deduced from correlation functions of primary fields using Ward identities, as was the case for the Virasoro algebra. A W(3)-Verma module appears in the fusion product of two other W(3)-Verma modules with a multiplicity that is in general infinite.

Differential equations

A correlation function may obey a differential equation that generalizes the BPZ equations if the fields have sufficiently many vanishing null vectors.

A four-point function of W(N)-primary fields on the sphere with one fully degenerate field obeys a differential equation if  but not if . In the latter case, for a differential equation to exist, one of the other fields must have vanishing null vectors.

Applications to conformal field theory

W-minimal models

W-minimal models are generalizations of Virasoro minimal models based on a W-algebra. Their spaces of states are made of finitely many fully degenerate representations. They exist for certain rational values of the central charge: in the case of the W(N) algebra, values of the type 

A W(N)-minimal model with central charge  may be constructed as a coset of Wess-Zumino-Witten models .

For example, the two-dimensional critical three-state Potts model has central charge .

Conformal Toda theory

Conformal Toda theory is a generalization of Liouville theory that is based on a W-algebra.

This depends on the cosmological constant , which plays no meaningful role, and on the parameter , which is related to the central charge.
For the preservation of conformal symmetry in the quantum theory, it is crucial that there are no more interaction terms than components of the vector .

The methods that lead to the solution of Liouville theory may be applied to W(N)-conformal Toda theory, but they only lead to the analytic determination of a particular class of three-point structure constants, and W(N)-conformal Toda theory with  has not been solved.

Logarithmic conformal field theory

At central charge , the Virasoro algebra can be extended by a triplet of generators of dimension , thus forming a W-algebra with the set of dimensions . Then it is possible to build a rational conformal field theory based on this W-algebra, which is logarithmic.

Related concepts

Classical W-algebras

Finite W-algebras

Finite W-algebras are certain associative algebras associated to nilpotent elements of semisimple Lie algebras.

The original definition, provided by Alexander Premet, starts with a pair  consisting of a reductive Lie algebra  over the complex numbers and a nilpotent element e.
By the Jacobson-Morozov theorem, e is part of a sl2 triple (e, h, f). The eigenspace decomposition of ad(h) induces a -grading on :

This induces a non-degenerate anti-symmetric bilinear form on the −1 graded piece by the rule:

After choosing any Lagrangian subspace , we may define the following nilpotent subalgebra which acts on the universal enveloping algebra by the adjoint action.

References

Further reading

Conformal field theory
Integrable systems
Representation theory